Pycnarmon cecinalis is a moth in the family Crambidae. It is found in Ecuador (Loja Province) and Honduras.

References

Moths described in 1897
Spilomelinae
Moths of Central America
Moths of South America